Guillaume Franke (born 27 October 1987) is a German international rugby union player, playing for RC Orléans in the Fédérale 1 and the German national rugby union team. He is the brother of Matthieu Franke, who has also played for Germany.

Franke made his debut for Germany against Georgia on 7 February 2010, replacing his brother after he had to withdraw with a knee injury.

Franke's club, RC Orléans, provided, in the past, a number of players to the German team, including him, his brother, Clemens von Grumbkow and Alexander Widiker.

Stats
Guillaume Franke's personal statistics in club and international rugby:

Club

 As of 30 April 2012

National team

 As of 8 April 2012

References

External links
 Guillaume Franke at scrum.com
   Guillaume Franke at totalrugby.de
 Guillaume Franke  at itsrugby.fr
  Guillaume Franke at the DRV website

1987 births
Living people
French rugby union players
German rugby union players
Germany international rugby union players
French people of German descent
RC Orléans players
Rugby union wings
Sportspeople from Hauts-de-Seine